Benoît Le Coffre (1671 – 1722) was a Danish painter of French descent. He became King Frederick IV's Court Painter in 1700 and is considered the earliest representative of light Rococo painting in Denmark.

Biography
Benoît Le Coffre was born in Copenhagen in 1671 to Claude Le Coffre who was also a painter as well as a sculptor with important commissions for the Court. Benoît was sent to Paris where he studied at the École des Beaux-Arts. He won the Prix de Rome in 1692 but seems not to have continued his studies in Rome. Little  is known about his early career and whereabouts but back in Denmark in 1700 he became Frederick IV's Court Painter alongside Hendrick Krock, the king's other Court Painter.

Works
His work includes portraits as well as many decorative works for the many royal residences. At Frederiksberg Palace, which was built just after the turn of the century, he painted 12 frescos featuring both scenes from antique mythology and swarming royal masquerade balls with musicians and  masked participants. Other buildings with decorative works by him include Rosenborg Castle, the Eremitage Lodge and the Chancellery building in Copenhagen.

Gallery

See also

 Art of Denmark

References

Danish painters
Danish Baroque painters
Danish male painters
Danish people of French descent
Artists from Copenhagen
1671 births
1722 deaths
Court painters